Foxes are dog-like omnivorous mammals.

Foxes or The Foxes may also refer to:

Arts and entertainment
 Foxes (film), a 1980 American teen drama
 The Foxes (Marc), a 1913 painting by Franz Marc
 The Foxes, a 1961 television pilot with Joan Crawford

Music
 Foxes (soundtrack), the soundtrack of the teen film
 Foxes (singer) (born 1989), British singer-songwriter
 The Foxes (band), a London-based indie rock group formed in 2006

Sports
 Leicester City F.C., an English professional football club nicknamed The Foxes
Marist Red Foxes, the athletic teams of Marist College, New York

See also
 The Foxes of Firstdark or Hunter's Moon, a 1989 novel by English fantasy author Garry Kilworth
 
 Fox (disambiguation)